The badminton tournaments at the 2018 Mediterranean Games took place between 23 and 26 June at the El Morell Pavilion in El Morell, Tarragona. This was the second time that badminton events held at the Mediterranean Games.

There are 63 athletes from 12 nations competed in four events: men's singles, women's singles, men's doubles and women's doubles.

Medal summary

Medalists

Medal table

References

External links 
 Tournament link at bwf.tournamentsoftware.com

Sports at the 2018 Mediterranean Games
2018
Mediterranean Games
Mediterranean Games,2018